Sembawang Rangers Football Club was a football club in Singapore, based in Yishun. The club played for S.League, the top division of football in Singapore. The club was also referred to among supporters as the "Stallions".

The club was formed as merger between Gibraltar Crescent and Sembawang Sports Club to enter the inaugural S.League in 1996.

Following a league revamp, the club was removed from the S.League at the end of the 2003 season.

The club produce one of the most prominent local player Yazid Yasin which earn 1 cap from the Singapore national football team.

Continental record

Seasons

References

External links
 S.League website page on Sembawang Rangers

 
Football clubs in Singapore
1996 establishments in Singapore
Singapore Premier League clubs